Two Brothers Running is a 1988 Australian comedy film directed by Ted Robinson and starring Tom Conti, Elizabeth Alexander, Ritchie Singer, and Asher Keddie.

The film never obtained a cinema release.

References

External links
Two Brothers Running at IMDb
Two Brothers Running at Oz Movies

Australian comedy films
Films directed by Ted Robinson (TV director)
1980s English-language films
1980s Australian films